Vijzelgracht metro station (Dutch: Station Vijzelgracht) is a station on the Route 52 (North–South Line) of the Amsterdam Metro in Amsterdam, Netherlands. It was opened on 22 July 2018.

Vijzelgracht is an underground station situated in the Weteringschans neighbourhood of the Amsterdam-Centrum borough. The station, designed by Benthem Crouwel Architects, is situated beneath the Vijzelstraat between Prinsengracht and Weteringschans in the former Vijzelgracht canal that was dammed in 1933. The station has a 125-metre-long island platform, approximately 9 metres wide. There are two entrances, the north entrance near the Maison Descartes and the south entrance near Weteringplantsoen. The south entrance also serves the tram lines 1, 7, 19 (east–west) and 24 (north–south). The station lies 26 metres below street level and is expected to handle a number of 22,000 passengers and passengers per day.

The platform is accessible by both lift and escalator. The station is future-proofed for a possible parking structure which would be located at the south entrance. It is also future-proofed for a long-proposed East–West metro line that would be built 11 metres below street level under either the Singelgracht or Weteringschans, with the line running over the North–South tunnel and under the south ticket hall.

History

Construction problems
Vijzelgracht station was beset with construction issues affecting nearby structures. On 19 June 2008, four historic buildings on the Vijzelstraat subsided 15 cm and its residents evacuated due to a breach in a tunnel wall, causing water to enter the tunnel, eroding the pilings that supported the buildings, with work stopped on 23 June. Work resumed on 9 September 2008, with the municipal government and the project bureau doing testing and assuring local residents that issues had been mitigated. However, on 10 September, additional buildings began subsiding again, this time 23 centimetres, again caused by water leaks in the tunnel.

In January 2009 a whistleblower, a concrete delivery driver, spoke to the press about the use of old concrete that resulted in cast walls that were brittle and of poor quality. Testing was ordered by the municipal government and conducted by the research firm Deltares, which found 114 weak points and a hole in the concrete sheet pilings used in the Vijzelgracht project. According to the firm, these weak spots were mostly caused by the "use of bad and contaminated concrete and poor reinforcement".

Ramses Shaffy naming proposal
In 2011, a proposal was made to name the station after Dutch actor and singer Ramses Shaffy, a longtime resident of the Vijzelgracht neighbourhood. The municipal government decided to retain the Vijzelgracht name under the policy of naming stations after their locations. However, the city invited artists to create a work of art dedicated to Shaffy in the metro station. On 23 February 2013, Liesbeth List announced on the Dutch television programme "Opium" that a portrait of Ramses Shaffy, interwoven with map lines of the Metro, was designed at the metro station, designed by Dutch artist Marjan Laaper.

Gallery

References 

Amsterdam Metro stations